
Kłodzko County is a unit of territorial administration and local government (powiat) in Lower Silesian Voivodeship, south-western Poland. It came into being on 1 January 1999 as a result of the Polish local government reforms passed in 1998.

It is located in a panhandle called Kłodzko Panhandle. The county's administrative seat is the town of Kłodzko; the other towns are: Duszniki-Zdrój, Nowa Ruda, Polanica-Zdrój, Bystrzyca Kłodzka, Kudowa-Zdrój, Lądek-Zdrój, Międzylesie, Radków, Stronie Śląskie and Szczytna. (The suffix Zdrój appearing in several of these names means "spa".)

As of 2019 the total population of the county was 158,600.

Neighbouring counties
Kłodzko County is bordered by Wałbrzych County to the north-west, Dzierżoniów County to the north and Ząbkowice Śląskie County to the north-east. It also borders the Czech Republic to the east, south and west.

Administrative division
The county is subdivided into 14 gminas (five urban, six urban-rural and three rural). These are listed in the following table, in descending order of population.

References

 
Land counties of Lower Silesian Voivodeship